Rainham is a town in the unitary authority of Medway, in Kent, South East England. The town forms a conurbation with neighbouring towns Chatham, Rochester, Strood and Gillingham.

Historically, Rainham was a separate village until, in 1928, it was added to the Municipal Borough of Gillingham, which was originally created in 1903 and was grouped into the latter's built-up area in analysis of the 2011 census by the Office for National Statistics. It became part of the Medway authority when Gillingham was incorporated with the other towns to form Medway Unitary Authority in 1998.

Geography

Three roads cross the town. The M2 motorway runs along its southern edge,  from the town centre. The main road through the town, the A2, follows the ancient Watling Street, the Roman road between London and Canterbury. The most northerly road runs close to the southern bank of the river. The Chatham Main Line has a railway station here and National Cycle Route 1 runs through the town.

The Park Wood estate to the south of Rainham was built mainly during the 1960s and 1970s. Building this estate required the destruction of one of the last large areas of relict woodland in North Kent. The area towards Gillingham is known as Rainham Mark, named after an old ecclesiastical boundary: and Macklands is an older part of the town to the north. The Macklands Arms public house was named after Macklands Manor House. The (now Grade II listed,) manor house was home to members of the Mackay family, who owned a printing company in Chatham. The company building is now part of CPi Books. Lower Rainham, once a separate village, is now also a part of the town.

Demographics

Rainham was originally a linear settlement along the main road. The population in 1801 was 422; two centuries later it is well over thirty thousand. Part of the reason for this huge growth can be attributed to the railway.
When the railway came in 1858 it brought an almost immediate increase in the size of the village; when the Chatham Main Line was electrified in 1959, as with all the places served by it, town growth began again. One of the results was the building of Parkwood estate (see above).

Amenities

The parish church is dedicated to St Margaret; the Roman Catholic church to St Thomas of Canterbury.

Facilities

Rainham has a small shopping area, including the Rainham Shopping Centre precinct, with a few major shops.  The precinct was built in the 1970s after the old church school building was demolished. The school originally opened in 1846 it was a community centre for the last few years of its life.  The school (St Margaret's) had moved to the old senior school building in Orchard Street in 1967.

Rainham is home to the first ever oast house theatre, where the Rainham Theatrical Society (RaTS) puts on regular performances.

Local media

Newspapers
Local newspapers for Rainham include the Medway Messenger, published by the KM Group. The area also has free newspapers in the Medway Extra (KM Group) and yourmedway (KOS Media).
In 2011 Medway News and Medway Standard, both published by Kent Regional News and Media were closed.

Radio
The local commercial radio station for Rainham is KMFM Medway, owned by the KM Group. Medway is also served by community radio station Radio Sunlight. The area can also receive the county wide stations BBC Radio Kent, Heart and Smooth.

Education

Rainham has four secondary schools:
The Howard School: a selective and secondary school for boys
Rainham Mark Grammar School: selective school for which the Medway Test has to be taken, open to both boys and girls
Rainham School for Girls: a comprehensive school for girls
Leigh Academy Rainham: a comprehensive school for girls and boys

For a full list of schools serving Rainham visit List of schools in Medway

Open spaces

The Riverside Country Park, which fronts on to the river Medway at Rainham Creek, includes the promontory of Horrid Hill. Berengrave Local Nature Reserve (a disused chalk pit) is located on the Lower Rainham Road.

There are also a number of parks and recreational grounds around Rainham.

See also
Medway
Chatham
Rochester
Strood
Gillingham

References

External links
History of Rainham

Gillingham, Kent
Populated places in Kent